Jacques Joseph Holzschuch (4 February 1874 – 12 June 1945) was a French fencer. He competed in the men's épée event at the 1900 Summer Olympics.

References

External links
 

1874 births
1945 deaths
French male épée fencers
Olympic fencers of France
Fencers at the 1900 Summer Olympics
Fencers from Paris
20th-century French people